Mosaic is a literary magazine, published by the nonprofit Literary Freedom Project, which focuses on  African-American and African diaspora literature. They began publishing in 1998, and are located in the Bronx, NY. The magazine is published on a triannual basis in February, June, and October.

References

External links
Mosaic web site
Literary Freedom Project website
All 41 Print Issues of Mosaic on AALBC

African-American literature
Literary magazines published in the United States
Magazines established in 1998
Magazines published in New York City
Triannual magazines published in the United States